The Muridava license block, also known as Block EX-27, is located on the continental shelf of the Romanian Black Sea. It was awarded in October 2011 to Melrose Resources, now Petroceltic International. The total estimated resources of the Muridava block are around 169 billion cubic feet (4.85 km³), and production could yield around 100 million cubic feet/day (2.8×106m³).

References

Black Sea energy

Natural gas fields in Romania